Matt Leveque (born September 20, 1984) is a lacrosse player for the Colorado Mammoth in the National Lacrosse League. Leveque was the captain of the Surrey Stickmen and All Star in the British Columbia Junior A league in 2005.  During the off season Matt plays for a local team, Langley Thunder.

While playing for the Langley Thunder on August 27, 2011, the team won the Western Lacrosse Association Championship for the first time in franchise history. Leveque is expected to play in the national Mann Cup that will be held in September 2011 at the Langley Events Centre.

Statistics

NLL

External links
 Player Bio Page

1984 births
Living people
Colorado Mammoth players
Canadian lacrosse players
Sportspeople from Surrey, British Columbia
Lacrosse people from British Columbia
Lacrosse defenders